|}

The Platinum Jubilee Stakes is a Group 1 flat horse race in Great Britain open to horses aged four years or older. Three-year-olds foaled in the Southern Hemisphere are also eligible. It is run at Ascot over a distance of 6 furlongs (1,207 metres), and it is scheduled to take place each year in June.

History
The event was established in 1868, and it was originally called the All-Aged Stakes. It was renamed the Cork and Orrery Stakes in 1926, in honour of the 9th Earl of Cork, who served as the Master of the Buckhounds in the 19th century.

The present system of race grading was introduced in 1971, and the Cork and Orrery Stakes was initially classed at Group 3 level. It was promoted to Group 2 status in 1998.

The race was renamed to commemorate the Golden Jubilee of Queen Elizabeth II in 2002. From this point it held Group 1 status. In 2012 the race was named the Diamond Jubilee Stakes, to commemorate the Diamond Jubilee of Queen Elizabeth II and in 2022 it was again renamed to the Platinum Jubilee Stakes, to commemorate the Platinum Jubilee of Queen Elizabeth II.

The Platinum Jubilee Stakes became part of a new international race series, the Global Sprint Challenge, in 2005.

The race is now contested on the final day of the five-day Royal Ascot meeting. Prior to 2015 the race was also open to three-year-olds. It was restricted to four-year-olds and up when a new six furlong Group One race, the Commonwealth Cup, was created at the meeting for three-year-olds only in 2015.

Records
Most successful horse (3 wins):
 Prince Charlie – 1872, 1873, 1874

Leading jockey (10 wins):
 Lester Piggott – Right Boy (1958, 1959), Tin Whistle (1960), El Gallo (1963), Mountain Call (1968), Welsh Saint (1970), Saritamer (1974), Swingtime (1975), Thatching (1979), College Chapel (1993)

Leading trainer (5 wins):
 Vincent O'Brien – Welsh Saint (1970), Saritamer (1974), Swingtime (1975), Thatching (1979), College Chapel (1993)

Leading owner (3 wins):
 Joseph Dawson – Prince Charlie (1872, 1873, 1874)
 Jack Joel – Sunflower II (1912), Hamlet (1923, 1924)

Winners since 1971

Earlier winners

As the All-Aged Stakes

 1868: Laneret
 1869: no race
 1870: Normanby
 1871: Cymbal
 1872: Prince Charlie
 1873: Prince Charlie
 1874: Prince Charlie
 1875: Lowlander
 1876: Lowlander
 1877: Ecossais
 1878: Trappist
 1879: Hackthorpe
 1880: Valentino
 1881: Charibert
 1882: Marden
 1883: Despair
 1884: Geheimniss
 1885: Energy
 1886: Whitefriar
 1887: Whitefriar
 1888: Deuce of Clubs
 1889: Napoleon
 1890: Mephisto
 1891: Bel Demonio
 1892: Peter Flower
 1893: Schemer
 1894: Northshampton
 1895: Grey Leg
 1896: Speed
 1897: Red Heart
 1898: St Lucia
 1899: Oria
 1900: Nattie
 1901: Bridge
 1902: Reine des Fleurs
 1903: Lord Bobs
 1904: Cossack
 1905: Delaunay
 1906: Queen's Holiday
 1907: Rocketter
 1908: Llangwm
 1909: Hillside III
 1910: New Castle II
 1911: Golden Rod
 1912: Sunflower II
 1913: Hornet's Beauty
 1914: Hornet's Beauty
 1915–18: no race
 1919: Freesia
 1920: Diadem
 1921: Tete a Tete
 1922: Pharmacie
 1923: Hamlet
 1924: Hamlet
 1925: Drake

As the Cork and Orrery Stakes

 1926: Diomedes
 1927: Highborn II
 1928: Zaretta
 1929: Royal Minstrel
 1930: Costaki Pasha
 1931: Grindleton
 1932: Slipper
 1933: The Divot
 1934: Solenoid
 1935: Winandermere
 1936: Bellacose
 1937: Pherozshah
 1938: Ipsden
 1939: Old Reliance
 1940–45: no race
 1946: Honeyway
 1947: The Bug
 1948: Delirium
 1949: Solonaway
 1950: Abadan
 1951: Bob Cherry
 1952: Royal Serenade
 1953: Blood Test
 1954: Key
 1955: Trouville
 1956: Grass Court
 1957: Matador
 1958: Right Boy
 1959: Right Boy
 1960: Tin Whistle
 1961: Bun Penny
 1962: Compensation
 1963: El Gallo
 1964: no race
 1965: Majority Blue
 1966: Current Coin
 1967: Siliconn
 1968: Mountain Call
 1969: Tudor Music
 1970: Welsh Saint

See also
 Horse racing in Great Britain
 List of British flat horse races
 Recurring sporting events established in 1868  – this race is included under its original title, All-Aged Stakes.

References

 Paris-Turf:
 Racing Post:

 galopp-sieger.de – Golden Jubilee Stakes (ex Cork and Orrery / All-Aged Stakes).
 horseracingintfed.com – International Federation of Horseracing Authorities – Diamond Jubilee Stakes (2018).
 pedigreequery.com – Golden Jubilee Stakes – Ascot.
 

Flat races in Great Britain
Ascot Racecourse
Open sprint category horse races
British Champions Series
Breeders' Cup Challenge series
Recurring sporting events established in 1868
1868 establishments in England